The Hungarian Cup is the Hungarian cup competition for football clubs. It was started by the Hungarian Football Association, the Magyar Labdarúgó Szövetség, in 1909, eight years after the commencement of the Hungarian League.

Besides all of the professional clubs of Hungary numerous amateur sides take part every year. These have to qualify through local cup competitions.

The most successful participant in the Magyar Kupa has been Ferencváros with 24 wins, followed by local rivals  MTK with 12 cups. The current holder is Ferencváros, having won their 24th title in 2022.

History
Although the first Hungarian League match was played in 1901, the first Hungarian Cup match was played eight years later in 1910 between MTK Budapest FC and Budapesti TC. The first era of the Magyar Kupa was dominated by the same clubs as in the Hungarian League: MTK Budapest FC and Ferencvárosi TC. In the 1910s MTK won four trophies, while Ferencváros only one. However, in the 1920s Ferencváros won three other titles, whereas MTK two cups. The only club able to interrupt the Ferencvárosi TC-MTK Budapest FC rivalry was Kispesti AC in 1926.

In the 1930s, new clubs finally broke through to win the Hungarian Cup, and two of them were from outside Budapest. In 1930 Bocskai FC and in 1934 Soroksár FC. The traditional clubs (MTK and Ferencváros) won three trophies: Ferencváros in 1933 and 1935, and MTK in 1932.

The 1940s were dominated by Ferencváros by winning the cup in a three consecutive seasons: 1941–42, 1942–43, and 1943–44. Ferencváros's dominance was interrupted by Szolnoki MÁV FC by winning the 1940–41 season.

Due to the Hungarian Revolution of 1956, the Magyar Kupa was held only three times in the 1950s. Three Budapest clubs could win in the 1950s: Budapesti Bástya, Budapesti Vasas SC, and Ferencvárosi TC. The 1960s were dominated by Rába ETO Győr by winning the cup in three consecutive seasons: 1965, 1966, and 1967. In 1969 Újpesti Dózsa SC became cup winners for the first time after losing five finals.

The 1970s were dominated by Budapest clubs. Ferencváros won four times, Újpest won twice, and Vasas SC won once. However, the 1976–77 season was won by Diósgyőri VTK. This was the first time when the cup finals was in a round-robin tournament.

In the 1980s, Újpesti Dózsa SC won three trophies, while Budapest Honvéd SE could lift the cup twice. In the 1990s Ferencvárosi TC won the cup four times. In 1999 Debreceni VSC won their first cup trophy.

In the early 2000s, the Magyar Kupa was dominated by Debrecen by winning three trophies in 2001, 2008, 2010. Debrecen's dominance was interrupted by Újpest in 2002, and Ferencváros in 2003, and 2004 while Honvéd could win the cup in 2007 and in 2009 Other non-Budapest cup winners were Videoton in 2006 and Sopron in 2005.

In the 2010s, the dominance of the non-Budapest clubs continued. Debrecen managed to clinch the cup twice in the 2011–12 and in the 2012–13 seasons while Kecskemét could lift the trophy in the 2010–11 season. However, Újpest surprisingly won the 2013–14 season while the rebuilt Ferencváros in 2014–15 season.

Austro-Hungarian Challenge Cup Finals

Magyar Kupa Finals

Notes:
Note 1: In 1912, Ferencvárosi TC did not play and lost by Walkover.
Note 2: Final from 1956 held in 1958.
Note 3: Final from 1977 played in Group-Format.

Statistics

Performances by club

Notes:
Note 4: Includes Ferencváros FC
Note 5: Includes MTK, MTK-VM, Hungária and Bástya.
Note 6: Includes Újpesti Dózsa and Újpesti TE.
Note 7: Includes Kispesti AC and Kispest-Honvéd.
Note 8: Includes Vasas ETO Gyõr and Rába Vasas ETO Gyõr.
Note 9: Includes Vasas SC, Budapesti Vasas SC
Note 10: Includes Diósgyőri MÁVAG SC 
Note 11: Includes FC Fehérvár and Videoton FC.
Note 12: Includes Pécsi MFC.
Note 13: Includes Szolnoki MÁV SE
Note 14: A team from Cluj-Napoca, Romania.

Performances by county 
As of 11 May 2022

Top scorers in the Final

The following football players scored at least three goals in the Magyar Kupa final. There have been only one player who scored four goals in one single match in the final of 1932–33, József Takács.

Four goals
 József Takács (Ferencváros FC) (1932–33)

Hat-trick
 Vilmos Kohut (Ferencváros FC) (1927–28)
 Pál Teleki (Bocskai FC) (1929–30)
 Pál Zilahi (III. Kerületi TVE) (1930–31)
 György Sárosi (Ferencvárosi TC) (1932–33)
 Béla Várady (Vasas SC) (1972–73)
 József Horváth (Újpesti Dózsa) (1974–75)
 János Görgei (Diósgyőri VTK) (1976–77)
 Péter Lipcsei (Ferencvárosi TC) (1994–95)
 Dorge Kouemaha (Debreceni VSC) (2007–08)
 Foxi Kethevoama (Kecskeméti TE) (2010–11)

Venues 

In the list below are included all the stadiums, inclusive the stadiums from finals with 2 or 3 legs.

Referees in the Final
As of 30 May 2017.

See also
 Nemzeti Bajnokság I
 Szuperkupa

References

External links
Hungary - List of Cup Finals, RSSSF.com

 
1
Hungary